is a railway station in the city of Tōkamachi, Niigata, Japan operated by East Japan Railway Company (JR East).

Lines
Gejō Station is served by the Iiyama Line, and is 82.8 kilometers from the starting point of the line at Toyono Station.

Station layout
The station consists of a single side platform serving one bi-directional track. The station is unattended.

History
Gejō Station opened on 25 November 1927. With the privatization of Japanese National Railways (JNR) on 1 April 1987, the station came under the control of JR East.

Surrounding area

 Gejō Post Office
 Gejō Middle School
 Gejō Elementary School

See also
 List of railway stations in Japan

External links

 JR East station information 

Railway stations in Niigata Prefecture
Railway stations in Japan opened in 1927
Iiyama Line
Tōkamachi, Niigata